Marriage Act may refer to a number of pieces of legislation:

Australia
 Marriage Act 1961, Australia's law that governs legal marriage.
 Marriage Amendment (Definition and Religious Freedoms) Act 2017

Canada
 Civil Marriage Act passed in Canada explicitly permitting same-sex marriages.

Hong Kong 
 Marriage Ordinance 1875
 Marriage Reform Ordinance 1970

India 
 Special Marriage Act, 1954
 Hindu Marriage Act, 1955

New Zealand
 Marriage Act 1854, an early law in the colony governing marriage
 Marriage Act 1955, the current Act
 Marriage (Definition of Marriage) Amendment Act 2013

South Africa
 Marriage Act, 1961, and its amending acts:
 Marriage Amendment Act, 1964
 Marriage Amendment Act, 1968
 Marriage Amendment Act, 1970
 Marriage Amendment Act, 1972
 Marriage Amendment Act, 1973
 Marriage Amendment Act, 1981
 Recognition of Customary Marriages Act, 1998, which recognised marriages under African customary law
 Civil Union Act, 2006, which extended marriage to same-sex couples

United Kingdom
 Royal Marriages Act 1772 (E & W & S)
 Deceased Wife's Sister's Marriage Act 1907 (7 Edw.7 c.47) (UK)

Extent unknown by author:
 Marriage Act 1811 or the Marriage of Lunatics Act 1811 (51 Geo.3 c.37) (the second short title was conferred by the Short Titles Act 1896, s.1 & first Sch.)
 Marriage Act 1823 (4 Geo.4 c.76) (short title: 1896 Act, s.1)
 Marriage Act 1824 (5 Geo.4 c.32) (short title: 1896 Act, s.1)
 Marriage Act 1835 (5 & 6 Will.4 c.54) (short title: 1896 Act, s.1)
 Marriage Act 1836 (6 & 7 Will.4 c.85) (short title: 1896 Act, s.1)
 Births and Deaths Registration Act 1837 (7 Will.4 & 1 Vict. c.22) (short title: 1896 Act, s.1)
 Marriage Act 1840 (3 & 4 Vict. c.72) (short title: 1896 Act, s.1)
 Marriage (Society of Friends) Act 1860 (23 & 24 Vict. c.18) (short title: 1896 Act, s.1)
 Marriage Confirmation Act 1860 (23 & 24 Vict. c.24) (short title: 1896 Act, s.1)
 Infant Marriage Act 1860 (23 & 24 Vict. c.83) (short title: 1896 Act, s.1)
 Marriage (Society of Friends) Act 1872 (35 & 36 Vict. c.10) (short title: 1896 Act, s.1)
 Greek Marriages Act 1884 (47 & 48 Vict. c.20)
 Marriages Validity Act 1886 (49 & 50 Vict. c.3)
 Marriages Act 1886 (49 & 50 Vict. c.14)

The Marriage Acts 1811 to 1886 means the Marriage Act 1811, the Marriage Act 1823, the Marriage Act 1824, the Marriage Confirmation Act 1830, the Marriage Act 1835, the Marriage Act 1836, the Births and Deaths Registration Act 1837, the Marriage Act 1840, the Marriage and Registration Act 1856, the Marriage (Society of Friends) Act 1860, the Marriage Confirmation Act 1860, the Marriage (Society of Friends) Act 1872, the Greek Marriages Act 1884, the Marriages Validity Act 1886 and the Marriages Act 1886.

The Marriage Acts 1811 to 1929 was the collective title of the Marriage Acts 1811 to 1898 and the Age of Marriage Act 1929 so far as it related to England.

England and Wales
 Marriage Act 1540 (32 Hen.8 c.38)
 Clergy Marriage Act 1548 (2 & 3 Edw.6 c.21)
(No short title) (2 & 3 Edw.6 c.23) (Repealed by the Marriage Act 1949, s.79 & fifth Sch., Pt.I)
 Clergy Marriage Act 1551 (5 & 6 Edw.6 c.12)
 Marriage Act 1697, a Penal Law passed in 1697 discouraging interfaith marriages.  All interfaith marriages would be considered legally Catholic.  The married couple would have to live under the tough Catholic laws.
 Clandestine Marriages Act 1753 (26 Geo. 2 c. 33)
 Marriage Confirmation Act 1830 (11 Geo.4 & 1 Will.4 c.18) (short title: 1896 Act, s.1)
 Marriage and Registration Act 1856 (19 & 20 Vict. c.119) (short title: 1896 Act, s.1)
 Foreign Marriage Act 1892
 Marriage with Foreigners Act 1906
 Marriage of British Subjects (Facilities) Act 1915
 Marriage of British Subjects (Facilities) Amendment Act 1916
 Age of Marriage Act 1929 (19 & 20 Geo 5 c 36)
 Marriage Act 1939
 Foreign Marriage Act 1947
 Marriage Act 1949
 Marriage Act 1949 (Amendment) Act 1954
 Marriage Acts Amendment Act 1958
 Marriage (Secretaries of Synagogues) Act 1959
 Marriage (Enabling) Act 1960
 Marriage (Wales and Monmouthshire) Act 1962
 Marriage (Registrar General's Licence) Act 1970
 Marriage Act 1983
 Marriage (Prohibited Degrees of Relationship) Act 1986
 Marriage (Wales) Act 1986
 Foreign Marriage (Amendment) Act 1988
 Marriage (Registration of Buildings) Act 1990
 Marriage Act 1994
 Marriage Ceremony (Prescribed Words) Act 1996
 City of London (Approved Premises for Marriage) Act 1996
 Forced Marriage (Civil Protection) Act 2007
 Marriage (Wales) Act 2010
 Marriage (Same Sex Couples) Act 2013
 Marriage and Civil Partnership (Minimum Age) Bill 2022

Scotland
 Marriage (Scotland) Act 1939
 Marriage (Scotland) Act 1956
 Marriage (Scotland) Act 1977
 Marriage (Scotland) Act 2002
 Marriage and Civil Partnership (Scotland) Act 2014

Northern Ireland
 Deceased Brother's Widow's Marriage Act (Northern Ireland) 1924
 Marriage (Declaration of Law) Act (Northern Ireland) 1944
 Age of Marriage Act (Northern Ireland) 1951

United States
 Affirmation of Marriage Act passed in Virginia and was subsequently overturned.
 Defense of Marriage Act (DOMA) passed in the United States to limit Federal marriage recognition to male-female couplings and thus proscribe the possibility of Federal same-sex marriage in the United States. DOMA was overturned in June 2013 after being found unconstitutional by the Supreme Court in United States v. Windsor.
 Marriage Protection Act (2004)
 Respect for Marriage Act (2022)

See also
 List of short titles
 Marriage law

References

Lists of legislation by short title and collective title